Radim Holub (born 12 November 1975) is a Czech former football player. He played more than 300 games in the Czech First League for various clubs including Jablonec, Hradec Králové, Sparta Prague, Mladá Boleslav and Drnovice. He won the 2000–01 Czech First League with Sparta Prague.

Following his professional career, Holub moved to MFK Chrudim to play on an amateur basis.

References

External links
 

1975 births
Sportspeople from Pardubice
Living people
Czech footballers
Czech Republic youth international footballers
Czech Republic under-21 international footballers
Czech First League players
FC Hradec Králové players
FK Jablonec players
AC Sparta Prague players
SK Kladno players
FK Drnovice players
FK Mladá Boleslav players
1. FC Slovácko players
Association football forwards
MFK Chrudim players
FK Čáslav players
Czech National Football League players